Jean Constantin (born Constantin Cornel Jean; 21 August 1927 – 26 May 2010) was a well-known Romanian comedian
of Greek ethnicity.
Constantin was born in Techirghiol, and died in Constanța.

Filmography

 (2010) .... Agârbiceanu
Vine poliția! (2008) .... Florică
 (2008) .... Limbă
Regina (2008) ..... Manole
Inimă de țigan (2007) ..... Manole
Roming (2007) .... Somali
Păcală se întoarce (2006)
Cum mi-am petrecut sfârșitul lumii (2006)
La urgență (2006) 
Meseriașii (2006).... Petre Pan
Ultimul stinge lumina (2004).... Petre Chircu
Sexy Harem Ada-Kaleh (2001)
A doua cădere a Constantinopolului (1994) .... Ismail
Atac în bibliotecă (1992)
Miss Litoral (1990) .... Nea Mielu' Long-Haul Captain
Chiriţa la Iași (1987)
În fiecare zi mi-e dor de tine (1987)
Coana Chirița (1986)
Colierul de turcoaze (1985) .... Professor Aurică
Masca de argint (1985) .... Professor Aurică
Sosesc păsările călătoare (1984)
Am o idee (1981) Maestro Max
Duelul (1981) .... Limbă
Un echipaj pentru Singapore (1981)
Iancu Jianu, haiducul (1981)
Pruncul, petrolul și Ardelenii (1981) Orthodox priest
Al treilea salt mortal (1980)
Nea Mărin miliardar (1979) .... Teach
Brațele Afroditei (1978)
Expresul de Buftea (1978)
Revanșa (1978) .... Limbă
Eu, tu și Ovidiu (1977)
Împușcături sub clar de lună (1977) .... Badea Cârneci
 Oil! (1977) .... Jean
Bunicul si doi delicventi minori (1976)Gloria nu cîntă (1976)Toate pînzele sus (1976) .... IsmailZile fierbinți (1976)Evadarea (1975)Mastodontul (1975)Nemuritorii (1974) .... ParaschivNu filmăm să ne amuzăm (1974)Ultimul cartuş (1973)Explozia (1973) .... TilicăUn comisar acuză (1973) .... LimbăAdio, dragă Nela! (1972)Felix și Otilia (1972)B.D. la munte și la mare (1971) .... PatrauleaBrigada Diverse în alertă! (1970) .... PatrauleaB.D. intră în acţiune (1970) .... PatrauleaHaiducii lui Șaptecai (1970) .... ParpanghelZestrea domniței Ralu (1970) .... ParpanghelCanarul și viscolul (1969)Prea mic pentru un război atît de mare (1969)Răzbunarea haiducilor (1968) .... ParpanghelZile de vară (1968) .... AurelMaiorul și moartea (1967)Procesul alb'' (1965)

References

External links

1927 births
2010 deaths
People from Techirghiol
20th-century Romanian male actors
21st-century Romanian male actors
Romanian male film actors
Romanian people of Greek descent